The olive-green camaroptera (Camaroptera chloronota) is a bird species in the family Cisticolidae.

Taxonomy
The olive-green camaroptera was described by the German ornithologist Anton Reichenow in 1895 under its current binomial name Camaroptera chloronota. The type locality is the forest of Missahohe in the West African state of Togo. The specific epithet chloronota is from the Ancient Greek khlōros meaning "green" and -nōtos meaning "-backed".

There are five subspecies:
 C. c. kelsalli Sclater, WL, 1927 – Senegal to Ghana
 C. c. chloronota Reichenow, 1895 – Togo to Cameroon, Gabon and Congo
 C. c. granti Alexander, 1903 – Bioko Island
 C. c. kamitugaensis Prigogine, 1961 – east DR Congo
 C. c. toroensis (Jackson, 1905) – Central African Republic and central DR Congo to southwest Kenya and northwest Tanzania (sometimes treated as a separate species)

Distribution and habitat
It is found in Benin, Cameroon, Central African Republic, Republic of the Congo, Democratic Republic of the Congo, Ivory Coast, Equatorial Guinea, Gabon, Gambia, Ghana, Guinea, Kenya, Liberia, Mali, Nigeria, Rwanda, Senegal, Sierra Leone, South Sudan, Tanzania, Togo, and Uganda.
Its natural habitats are subtropical or tropical moist lowland forests, subtropical or tropical moist montane forests, and subtropical or tropical moist shrubland.

It tends to fly in flocks of 50–100, so far it avoids intercontinental migration.

References

olive-green camaroptera
Birds of the Gulf of Guinea
Birds of Sub-Saharan Africa
olive-green camaroptera
Taxonomy articles created by Polbot